Eburia tetrastalacta is a species of beetle in the family Cerambycidae.

References

Further reading
  Pl. 37, fig. 3.
  Pl. 37, fig. 3.
 
 
 
 

Eburia